Hilde Urbaniak is a retired West German slalom canoeist who competed in the late 1950s. She won a gold medal in the folding K-1 event at the 1959 ICF Canoe Slalom World Championships in Geneva.

References
ICF medalists for Olympic and World Championships – Part 2: rest of flatwater (now sprint) and remaining canoeing disciplines: 1936–2007.

West German female canoeists
Possibly living people
Year of birth missing (living people)
Medalists at the ICF Canoe Slalom World Championships